The Church Missionary Society College High School (CMS High School) is situated in Kottayam, Kerala, India.

History
It was started by the Church Missionary Society, England, in 1817 when no institution existed in the then-Travancore state to teach English. Rev. C.Y.Thomas in the History of Madhya Kerala Diocese says: "After 1836 we find in the C.M.S. records, references to the 'Kottayam Village Mission' with Bailey in charge of it and 'the Kottayam District Mission' under Baker, with his headquarters at Pallom, five miles to the South. They also continued educational work and built another college at Kottayam, the C.M.S. College in 1838. The new college made its real start in 1840 when the Rev. John Chapman took charge of it.   According to Agur, in Church History of Travancore, Nagam Aiya and Velu Pillai in separate editions of Travancore Manual have recorded that Scott christian College, Nagercoil started its career as a school in 1805 and evolved into a full-fledged college in 1817. So chronologically, Scott Christian College founded by LMS missionaries was the first college in the princely state of Travancore.

Rev. Benjamin Bailey was the first principal of The College, COTTYM, as it was then called and spelt. The government welcomed the College as "a place of general education whence any demands of the state for officers to fill all departments of public service would be met". In the early years, the curriculum included the study of Latin, Greek, Hebrew, Mathematics, History and Geography besides English, Malayalam, Sanskrit and Syriac. In 1838, the college was shifted to the wooded hillock — the present site — commanding views of the distant Western Ghats. One of the oldest buildings in the campus is Room 52 or "Grammar School," as it was then named. The college magazine in Malayalam was started in 1864 by the then-principal Richard Collins, after whom the College Library is named.

In 1857 the college was affiliated to Madras University soon after its incorporation and the college presented students for the Matriculation examination. The college provided free education to all the students until 1855 when the fee of one Rupee a month began to be collected from each student. The total number of students in 1870 was only 129. In 1880, the Maharaja of Travancore who visited the college observed: "Long before the state undertook the humanizing task of educating the subjects, the Christian Missionaries had raised the beacon of knowledge in the land".

In 1890, two-year classes were started and the first batch of students was presented for the F.A Examination in 1892. It was in 1938 that female students were admitted in the college for the first time.

In 1840, the number of students in the college was 220. In 1950, Degree classes were started and by 1960, the number of students in the college rose to 1250. Postgraduate classes were started in 1959. The college is now affiliated to Mahatma Gandhi University, Kottayam.

In 1981, the Synod of the Church of South India transferred the management of the college to the C.S.I. Madhya Kerala Diocese.

Thy Word Is Truth is the motto of the college.

In 1999 the college was accredited by the National Assessment and Accreditation Council (NAAC) with five star status. Later in 2004 the University Grants Commission (UGC)accorded the status of college with Potential for Excellence (CPE).

Academics
The college has 14 departments and 47 courses. There are six research centers in the college. Ph.D. research work is conducted in the departments of Botany, Zoology, Physics, Chemistry, English and Commerce.

Notable alumni
The Alumni of the college include 
 Dr. K. R. Narayanan, former President of India; 
 Mr.K. P. S. Menon; formulator of Indian foreign policy; 
 Sardar K. M. Panicker, former ambassador to China ; 
 Dr. E.C.G Sudharshan, world-famous physicist; 
 Padmabhooshan Dr. Jacob Chandy, noted neurosurgeon ; 
 Justice K. T. Thomas, former Judge of the Supreme Court of India; 
 Padmabhooshan Sri. K. M. Mathew, chief Editor of Malayala Manorama; 
 Mr.Oommen Chandy, 
 George C Abraham, former Chief Minister of Kerala.

References 

Church of South India
High schools and secondary schools in Kerala
Christian universities and colleges in India
Schools in Kottayam district
1817 establishments in India
Educational institutions established in 1817
Schools founded by missionaries